Willem Stephanus Britz (born 31 August 1988) is a South African rugby union player, currently playing with the Houston SaberCats in Major League Rugby (MLR).

Career

At youth level, he represented  at the U18 Craven Week tournaments in 2005 and 2006. He made his debut for the Cheetahs in the 2009 Vodacom Cup game against the Mighty Elephants.

He played another 4 games for the Cheetahs during the 2011 Vodacom Cup season and also represented  in the Varsity Cup during the 2008, 2009, 2010, 2011 and 2012 seasons.

He joined the  just before the start of the 2012 Currie Cup Premier Division season and made his Golden Lions debut in their first game of the season against his former team, the Cheetahs.

He played in both legs of the ' promotion/relegation matches after the 2013 Super Rugby season, which saw the  regain their spot in Super Rugby.

References

South African rugby union players
Golden Lions players
Free State Cheetahs players
Griffons (rugby union) players
Lions (United Rugby Championship) players
Rugby union players from Cape Town
Rugby union locks
Rugby union flankers
Afrikaner people
1988 births
Living people
Urayasu D-Rocks players
South African expatriate rugby union players
Expatriate rugby union players in Japan
South African expatriate sportspeople in Japan
Sunwolves players
Houston SaberCats players
NTT DoCoMo Red Hurricanes Osaka players